Music from the Motion Picture Josie and the Pussycats is the soundtrack album to the 2001 film of the same name, starring Rachael Leigh Cook, Rosario Dawson, and Tara Reid. It was released on March 27, 2001 by Playtone, in conjunction with Epic, Riverdale Records and Sony Music Soundtrax.

Production
Producer and singer-songwriter Kenneth "Babyface" Edmonds served as the executive producer of the songs for the film. The soundtrack was released by Sony Music SoundTrax, the day before the film was released. The songs in the film were actually performed with Kay Hanley, singer for Letters to Cleo, as the singing voice of Josie. Rachael Leigh Cook lip synched to the songs in the film, and according to a documentary that accompanied the DVD version of the movie, the three lead actresses sang backup vocals on many of the songs. Despite the film's underperformance at the box office, the soundtrack was well received and was even certified as a gold album selling more than 500,000 copies.

Contributors include Bif Naked, Adam Schlesinger (Fountains of Wayne, Ivy), Dave Gibbs and Steve Hurley (Gigolo Aunts), Jason Falkner (Jellyfish), Matthew Sweet, Jane Wiedlin (The Go-Go's), Adam Duritz (Counting Crows), Anna Waronker (That Dog), and Kay Hanley and Michael Eisenstein (Letters to Cleo).

Track listing

Credits
Josie and the Pussycats
Josie McCoy - lead vocals, guitar
Valerie Brown - bass, backing vocals
Melody Valentine - drums, percussion, backing vocals

DuJour
Marco Brown - vocals
Les Frame - vocals
Travis McCoy - vocals
DJ Parker - vocals

Singing credits
Kay Hanley - vocals (Josie and the Pussycats)
John Stephan & J'son Thomas - vocals (DuJour)

Production
Kenneth Edmonds (tracks 1-5), Adam Schlesinger (tracks 6-10, 13), residential campaign (tracks 11-12), Guliano Franco (track 12) - producers
Dave Gibbs (tracks 1-5) - co-producer
Kenneth Edmonds, Glen Brunman, Denise Luiso - executive producers
Mike Denneen, Paul Boutin, Adam Schlesinger - engineers
David J. Holman - mixing
 Mixed - Cactus Studio, Hollywood
Stephen Marcussen - mastering
Stewart Whitmore - digital editing
Anthony President - programming

Charts

Weekly charts

Year-end charts

Certifications

References

2001 soundtrack albums
Columbia Records soundtracks
2000s film soundtrack albums
Josie and the Pussycats
Cast recordings
Albums produced by Adam Schlesinger